Aurelio Carlo Pietro Teodoro Giorni (15 September 1895 – 23 September 1938) was an Italian-American pianist and composer. After immigrating to the United States in 1914, he toured the nation as a soloist and with the Elshuco Trio.  He composed chamber music, orchestral music, études, as well as a sonata for piano and violoncello.

Early life
Aurelio was born on September 15, 1895, in Perugia, Italy, the first of two sons born to Carlo Giuseppe Giorni, a Roman landscape painter, and Linda Bergner Giorni, an American mezzo-soprano. Aurelio was the great-grandson of Danish sculptor Bertel Thorvaldsen. Aurelio's parents had him tutored privately at home until, at age 13, he attended Santa Cecilia Conservatory of Music and studied piano with Maestro Giovanni Sgambati and Ferruccio Busoni from 1909 to 1911.

He performed joint recitals with his mother Linda as early as February 1908, when he was 12 years old. One such performance took place at the Hotel Excelsior in Rome on March 23, 1911.  The press notice read as follows:The Giorni Concert at the Hotel Excelsior, attracted a very large number of ladies and gentlemen who are already aware of the unusual musical gifts possessed by Madame Linda Giorni & her son, Aurelio.All the numbers of the program were well received, and while the singing of Madame Giorni has been for several years the admiration of the Roman public, the remarkable interpretation give by Aurelio Giorni, (only 15 years old, and yet a composer of merit) added much to the novelty and interest.  He played compositions by Bach, Chopin, Scarlatti and Sgambati in a manner which astonished and delighted the audience.  His success was all the more marked because an unfortunate accident had happened to the piano, and the young musician was obliged to play without the use of the pedals.  Madame Giorni sang arie & remanse by Haendel, Sgambati, Tschaikovsky, Brahms & Strauss, as well as compositions by Aurelio Giorni, who accompanied his mother on the piano.

Aurelio graduated from Santa Cecilia before he turned 15, enabling him to enter the Meisterschule für Komposition (Master School for Composition) in Berlin in 1911. There he studied composition with German composer Engelbert Humperdinck and Russian-born pianist, conductor, and composer Ossip Gabrilowitsch.

Aurelio was 16 when he returned to Rome to perform as a soloist. There, in 1912, Aurelio met his future wife, Helen Emerson Miller. Aurelio was known the "wonder child" of Carlo and Linda and was considered a remarkable pianist and composer at only 17 years old.

Between 1913 and 1915 he toured Germany, Switzerland, the Netherlands, and Scandinavia.

Life in the U.S.
On coming to America in the fall of 1914, Aurelio first stayed with his mother's sister, Emma Bergner Sajous and her husband Charles E. de M. Sajous in Philadelphia.  When he moved, it was to two residences, one in New York City and one in Philadelphia, the latter for convenience as he had a number of pupils there.  It was in New York City that he maintained his studio at 100 Carnegie Hall, and renewed his acquaintance with the Miller family.

In 1918, after America entered World War I, Aurelio enlisted at Fort Hamilton, N.Y., exiting as a private in the U.S. Army. This military service lasted just 6 months but would later hasten his eligibility for U.S. citizenship. In 1919 he joined the Elshuco Trio and began concertizing in New York City and would perform with them over the next 15 years.  Aurelio was an active member of The Bohemians, a New York Musicians Club that began in 1907 and continues to this day.

Aurelio returned to Italy to visit his parents in the summer of 1919, and it was that autumn that he began making some 24 known piano rolls for the Duo-Art reproducing piano.

In May 1920, Aurelio and Helen became engaged, and they were married on January 1, 1921. They had three daughters: Helen Linda, born in 1921; Yolanda Elisa, born in 1924; and Aurelia Maria, born in 1927.

Death
Friday September 23, 1938, was the last day of the Berkshire Festival of Chamber Music, and the last time Aurelio was seen alive.  It had been raining heavily due to the record hurricane of 1938.  That Friday evening the family called the police to report him missing.  The next day the police called to say they'd had a report that a young girl had seen a man answering his description jump off the Pomeroy Avenue bridge into the raging river, and a pocketbook of his was found on the bridge.  A thorough search was conducted, including combing the river for several days, without success.  It was not until Helen talked to "Aunt Hattie" (Mrs. Charles Harrington), an elderly clairvoyant she would visit who'd been friends with her parents.  It was Aunt Hattie who "saw" Aurelio's suicide, by water, and it was she who described to Helen the location of Aurelio's body after several days in the river—a place she had never visited.  When Helen relayed the information given her to the Pittsfield police, they are able to find his body on September 30 in the Housatonic River, 1000 feet south of the Pomeroy Avenue bridge.

Aurelio may have been very discouraged and depressed.  He was notified just 10 days before his death that his services at Smith College would not be required for the coming term, and was also disappointed when none of his compositions was given place on the South Mountain program, nor was he among the festival performers.  Several months prior, on April 25, Aurelio and his family went to Carnegie Hall for the first performance of his Symphony in D Minor, being given that night by the National Orchestral Association under the leadership of conductor Léon Barzin.  Aurelio and Helen waited up past midnight for the New York reviews.  When Aurelio reads them, he is very dejected.  The critic had indicated he never wanted to hear the symphony again.   Aurelio had no desire to compose afterwards.

Aurelio Giorni was laid to rest in the family plot at Rosedale Cemetery, Orange, New Jersey, on October 3, 1938.  The service at All Angels' Church was conducted by the rector George Trowbridge and the emeritus rector Reverend Townsend, who knew Aurelio as a boy in Italy.  Aurelio's quartet was played by the Smith College quartet and several of his works were played on the organ by another friend, Seth Bingham.  There was no singing but Laurens Seelye (childhood friend of Helen) read several poems which Aurelio set to music.

A Memorial Concert organized by Musicraft Records was later held at New York Town Hall on December 26, 1938.  The musicians were Max Hollaender (violin), Sterling Hunkins (cello), and Eugene Kusmiak (piano), performing the Trio in C Major, a mastery of harmonic and contrapuntal technique characteristic of the composer's mature work.

Elshuco Trio

The Elshuco Trio was formed in 1918 with founding members Samuel Gardner (violin), Willem Willeke (violincello), and Richard Epstein (piano).  Willem Willeke was the leader and remained the only cellist throughout the group's existence.  The unusual first name was derived from the first syllables of the name of their patroness, Elizabeth Shurtleff Coolidge (1864-1953), who established the Berkshire String Quartet in 1916 and started the Berkshire Chamber Music Festival at South Mountain, Pittsfield, Massachusetts, in 1918.  The group had its first public performance at Aeolian Hall in midtown Manhattan in New York City on October 31, 1918.

Aurelio joined the group in the summer of 1919 after Richard Epstein's death.  Late in 1919, Reber Johnson also played with the group briefly. By 1920, Elias Breeskin had replaced Samual Gardner on violin.  Elias Breeskin left in 1921 and was replaced by William Kroll the following year, who stayed with the group until 1929, when he was replaced by Karl Kraeuter.

The Trio sometimes played for the annual  Berkshire Festival of Chamber Music in South Mountain, Pittsfield, Massachusetts.  Other known appearances reported where:

The last performance of the Elshuco Trio was their final concert of their 15th season on March 7, 1933, in the United Engineering Societies auditorium (New York), and was augmented for the occasion by Conrad Held, violinist.  The works played were the two Brahms piano quartets, in A Major, Op. 26, and G Minor, Op. 25.

Piano Recordings (Duo-Art)
The following list shows the known recordings Aurelio Giorni made for Duo-Art beginning around 1919.
Some of these piano rolls are in the archives of the University of Maryland Music Library.

° Selections listed in the University of Maryland catalog.

°° The only other known commercial recording of a Giorni composition (Musicraft Album No. 33, published June 1939).  This charmingly naive little Pastorale was written in 1908, when Aurelio (then 13 years old) had studied harmony, counterpoint and composition for 4 years.

Elshuco Trio Recordings (Brunswick label)
The following list, provided by the Library of Congress Music Division in 1985, represents all the recordings made by the Elshuco Trio which are known to be extant at the time, in 5 large American libraries.  There are three known early recordings which are not on this list - "Narcissus" and "Rosary" by Nevin and one of the Hungarian Dances by Brahms.  Stanford University (CST) also has annotated copies of pages from the Brunswick catalogs of 1923 and 1925, where it is noted that these selections were chosen for popular appeal rather than a representative sampling of their repertoire.

° CST - Stanford University; CTY - Yale University; DLC - Library of Congress; NN - New York Public Library; NSY - Syracuse University

°° Re-issued

Compositions

NOTE: Early in 1969, Helen Giorni donated to (1) Exchange & Gift (Music) Division, Library of Congress, and (2) New York Public Library for the Performing Arts, Music Division, all of Aurelio's music in her files, whether published or not.  This was all cataloged and two lists were prepared, one for each library.  

The New York Public Library for the Performing Arts (NYPLPA) has numerous scores from the Giorni estate cataloged under call number JPB 83-61.

Other works
The following compositions are known to exist as part of the NYPLPA collection or others, but for which the year they were written is uncertain.  Most of these were likely unpublished.
 Aria for piano, in F Major
 Concerto in D Major, for pianoforte and orchestra
 Double fugue for piano, 4 hands
 Fantasie-sonata in A Minor
 Intermezzo in C Minor, for flute, violoncello and harp (or piano)
 Merry fugue in Eb, for piano
 Six modal quatrains, for female 4-part chorus
 The Music Makers, for chorus (SATB), unaccompanied
 The Phantom Leaves, song for mixed 4-part chorus a cappella or with string quartet accompaniment
 Rhapsody Diveretissement, for piano, oboe, clarinet, horn and bassoon
 Sonata in E Minor, for piano and violin
 Sonata in D Minor, for piano and violoncello (or viola)
 The Dreamer, song for 4 part male chorus (or quartet) with 2 piano accompaniment
 Trio in Bb, for piano, violin and violoncello
 Variations Concertantes on The British Grenadiers, for flute, violin, viola, violoncello and harp (or piano)
 Zodiac Town - 12 children's carols, for 4 mixed voices (a cappella, or with piano accompaniment); words by Nancy Byrd Turner

Additionally, the NYPLPA collection lists over two dozen "songs with piano accompaniment" not listed here, many that contains words credited to several individuals.

External links
 WorldCat Identity for Giorni, Aurelio 1895-1938, 30 works in 33 publications in 3 languages and 111 library holdings
 Duo-Art rolls available at spencerserolls.com played by Aurelio Giorni
 The Ellis Island Ship Database page showing Aurelio and Marcello returning from Italy on the Ryndam in September 1920 (passengers #163 and #164).
 Aurelio Giorni on Facebook
 Piano Music for the Left Hand Alone (G) (short bio)

References

 This article is largely based on the book The Broken Pedal: A Biographical Sketch of Pianist/Composer Aurelio Giorni, 1895-1938 and His Family, a privately published work by Elena G. Burns (daughter, 1921–1998) during 1985/86 in Whittier, California.  Although distribution was limited mainly to family members, copies were also provided to the Library of Congress and the New York Public Library.

1895 births
1938 deaths
American male composers
Italian emigrants to the United States
20th-century American composers
20th-century American pianists
American male pianists
20th-century American male musicians
Accademia Nazionale di Santa Cecilia alumni
1938 suicides
Suicides by drowning in the United States